Since 1990, the American Dialect Society (ADS) has designated one or more words or terms to be the Word of the Year in the United States.

Word of the Year

 1990: bushlips (similar to "bullshit" – stemming from President George H. W. Bush's 1988 "Read my lips: no new taxes" broken promise)
 1991: mother of all (as in Saddam Hussein's foretold "Mother of all battles")
 1992: Not! (meaning "just kidding")
 1993: information superhighway
 1994: cyber, morph (to change form)
 1995: web and (to) newt (to act aggressively as a newcomer, like Speaker Newt Gingrich during the Contract with America)
 1996: mom (as in "soccer mom")
 1997: millennium bug
 1998: e- (as in "e-mail" or "e-commerce")
 1999: Y2K
 2000: chad (from the 2000 presidential election controversy in Florida)
 2001: 9-11
 2002: weapons of mass destruction (WMD)
 2003: metrosexual
 2004: red state, blue state, purple state (from the 2004 United States presidential election)
 2005: truthiness (popularized on The Colbert Report)
 2006: plutoed (demoted or devalued, as happened to the former planet Pluto)
 2007: subprime (an adjective used to describe a risky or less than ideal loan, mortgage, or investment)
 2008: bailout (in the specific sense of the rescue by the government of companies on the brink of failure, including large players in the banking industry)

 2009: tweet (a short, timely message sent via the Twitter.com service, and verb, the act of sending such a message)
 2010: app (an abbreviated form of application, a software program for a computer or phone operating system)
 2011: occupy (verb or noun inspired from the Occupy movements of 2011)
 2012: hashtag (a word or phrase preceded by a hash symbol (#), used on Twitter to mark a topic or make a commentary)
 2013: because introducing a noun, adjective, or other part of speech (e.g., "because reasons," "because awesome").
 2014: #blacklivesmatter: hashtag used as protest over blacks killed at the hands of police (esp. Michael Brown in Ferguson, Missouri, and Eric Garner in Staten Island, New York).
 2015: Singular they (as a gender-neutral pronoun, especially for non-binary gender identities)
 2016: dumpster fire (an exceedingly disastrous or chaotic situation)
 2017: fake news (disinformation or falsehoods presented as real news or actual news that is claimed to be untrue)
 2018: tender age shelter (a euphemism for facilities in which children of asylum seekers are detained by government officials)
 2019: (my) pronouns, as used in the context of introducing the correct third-person pronouns to refer to an individual.
 2020: Covid, referring to the COVID-19 pandemic.
 2021: insurrection, referring to the January 6 attacks on the US Capitol.
 2022: -ussy (suffix derived from pussy)

At the end of each decade, the society also chooses a Word of the Decade: web for the 1990s, google (as a verb) for the 2000s, and singular they for the 2010s. In 2000, jazz was selected as "Word of the 20th Century", and she as "Word of the Past Millennium".

Selection
Other candidates for "Word of the Year" have included:
 2006: Plutoed beat "climate canary" (something whose poor health indicates a looming environmental catastrophe) in a run-off vote for the 2006 word of the year. Other words in the running were flog (an advertisement disguised as a blog or web log), The Decider (a political catchphrase said by former United States President George W. Bush), "prohibited liquids" (fluids that cannot be transported by passengers on airplanes), and macaca (an American citizen treated as an alien)
 2007: Among the contenders were green- (a designation of environmental concern, as in greenwashing), surge (an increase in troops in a war zone, as in the Iraq War troop surge of 2007), Facebook (all parts of speech), waterboarding (an interrogation technique in which the subject is immobilized and doused with water to simulate drowning), Googlegänger (a portmanteau of Google and Doppelgänger, meaning a person with your name who shows up when you google yourself), and wide stance, "to have a —" (to be hypocritical or to express two conflicting points of view, in reference to Senator Larry Craig after his 2007 arrest at an airport)
 2010: Nom lost in a run-off with app
 2011: 99%, 99 percenters and the acronym FoMO (fear of missing out) lost in a run-off with occupy
 2012: Other nominees were YOLO (an acronym for "You Only Live Once," often used sarcastically or self-deprecatingly), fiscal cliff (the threat of spending cuts and tax increases looming over end-of-year budget negotiations), Gangnam style (the trendy style of Seouls Gangnam District, as used in the Korean pop song of the same name), marriage equality (legal recognition of same-sex marriage), and 47 percent (a claimed portion of the population that does not pay federal income tax).
 2013: slash: used as a coordinating conjunction to mean "and/or" (e.g., "come and visit slash stay") or "so" ("I love that place, slash can we go there?"), twerk: A mode of dance that involves vigorous booty-shaking and booty-thrusting, usually with the feet planted, Obamacare: term for the Affordable Care Act that has moved from pejorative to matter-of-fact shorthand and selfie: a photo taken of oneself, typically with a smartphone and shared on social media.
 2014: bae: a sweetheart or romantic partner, columbusing: cultural appropriation, especially the act of a white person claiming to discover things already known to minority cultures, even: deal with or reconcile difficult situations or emotions (from "I can't even"), manspreading: of a man, to sit with one's legs wide on public transit in a way that blocks other seats.
 2015: ammosexual, ghost, on fleek, thanks, Obama
 2016: woke, normalize, post-truth, #NoDAPL, 🔥
 2017: alternative facts, #MeToo, milkshake duck, persisterhood/persister, pussyhat, take a knee, whomst
 2018: yeet, (the) wall, X strong, Individual 1, white-caller crime
 2019: ok boomer, cancel, Karen
 2020: 2020, antiracism, Before Times, BIPOC, doomscrolling, pandemic, social distancing, unprecedented
 2021: antiwork, Big Lie, Great Resignation, long COVID, Omicron, variant, vax/vaxx
 2022: Dark Brandon, quiet quitting, rizz, Slava Ukraini, special military operation

Categories
In addition to the "Word of the Year", the society also selects words in other categories that vary from year to year:

Most useful
 2008: Barack Obama (specifically, the use of both names as combining forms, such as ObamaMania or Obamacare)
 2009: fail (noun or interjection used when something is egregiously unsuccessful)
 2010: nom (onomatopoetic form connoting eating, esp. pleasurably)
 2011: humblebrag (expression of false humility, especially by celebrities on Twitter)
 2012: -(po)calypse, -(ma)geddon (hyperbolic combining forms for various catastrophes)
 2013: because introducing a noun, adjective, or other part of speech (e.g., "because reasons," "because awesome").
 2014: even (deal with or reconcile difficult situations or emotions, from "I can't even")
 2015: they (gender-neutral singular pronoun for a known person, particularly as a non-binary identifier)
 2016: gaslight (psychologically manipulate a person into questioning their own sanity)
 2017: die by suicide (a variant of "to commit suicide" that does not suggest a criminal act)
 2018: Voldemorting (avoiding mention of unpleasant person or topic by using a replacement term à la Lord Voldemort)
 2019: ok boomer (retort to someone older expressing out-of-touch or condescending views)
 2020: Before Times (the time before the beginning of the COVID-19 pandemic)
 2021: hard pants (pants that lack an elastic waistband or stretchy fabric)
 2022: quiet quitting (doing no more than the minimum required for a job)

Most creative
 2008: recombobulation area: an area at General Mitchell International Airport in which passengers that have passed through security screening can get their clothes and belongings back in order.
 2009: Dracula sneeze: covering one's mouth with the crook of one's elbow when sneezing, seen as similar to popular portrayals of the vampire Dracula, in which he hides the lower half of his face with a cape.
 2010: prehab: preemptive enrollment in a rehab facility to prevent relapse of an abuse problem.
 2011: Mellencamp: a woman who has aged out of being a "cougar", named after John Cougar Mellencamp.
 2012: gate lice: airline passengers who crowd around a gate, waiting to board.
 2013: catfish: to misrepresent oneself online, especially as part of a romantic deception.
 2014: columbusing: cultural appropriation, especially the act of a white person claiming to discover things already known to minority cultures.
 2015: ammosexual: someone who loves firearms in a fetishistic manner.
 2016: laissez-fairydust: magical effect brought upon by laissez-faire economics.
 2018: white-caller crime (phenomenon of white people calling police on black people for doing mundane things, e.g. driving while black, running while black, shopping while black)
 2019: nobody: (phrasal template mocking someone providing an unsolicited opinion)
 2021: Fauci ouchie (rhyming phrase for a COVID-19 vaccine, in honor of Dr. Anthony Fauci)
 2022: -ussy (suffix derived from pussy)

Most unnecessary
 2008: moofing (a PR firm-created term for working on the go with a laptop and cell phone)
 2009: sea kittens (attempted rebranding of fish by PETA)
 2010: refudiate (blend word of refute and repudiate used by Sarah Palin on Twitter)
 2011: bi-winning (term used by Charlie Sheen to describe himself pridefully, dismissing accusations of being bipolar)
 2012: legitimate rape (type of rape that Missouri Senate candidate Todd Akin claimed rarely results in pregnancy)
 2013: sharknado (a tornado full of sharks, as featured in the Syfy Channel movie of that name)
 2014: baeless: without a romantic partner (lacking a bae).
 2015: manbun: man's hairstyle pulled up in a bun.

Most outrageous
 2008: terrorist fist jab (a phrase for a fist bump coined by Fox News newscaster E. D. Hill)
 2009: death panel (a supposed committee of doctors and/or bureaucrats who would decide which patients would and wouldn't receive treatment)
 2010: gate rape (pejorative term for invasive new airport pat-down procedure)
 2011: assholocracy (rule by obnoxious multi-millionaires)
 2012: legitimate rape (type of rape that Missouri Senate candidate Todd Akin claimed rarely results in pregnancy)
 2013: underbutt (the underside of buttocks, made visible by certain shorts or underwear)
 2014: second-amendment: v. to kill (someone) with a gun, used ironically by gun control supporters.
 2015: fuckboy, fuckboi: derogatory term for a man who behaves objectionably or promiscuously.

Most euphemistic
 2008: scooping technician (a person whose job it is to pick up dog poop)
 2009: hike the Appalachian trail (to go away to have sex with one's illicit lover, from a statement released by South Carolina Governor Mark Sanford to cover for visiting his Argentinean mistress)
 2010: kinetic event (Pentagon term for violent attacks on troops in Afghanistan)
 2011: job creator (a person responsible for economic growth and employment)
 2012: self-deportation (policy of encouraging illegal immigrants to return voluntarily to their home countries)
 2013: least untruthful (involving the smallest necessary lie, used by intelligence director James Clapper)
 2014: EIT: abbreviation for the already euphemistic "enhanced interrogation technique."
 2015: Netflix and chill: sexual come-on masked as a suggestion to watch Netflix and relax.
 2018: racially charged (circumlocution for “racist”)
 2019: people of means (rich people)
 2020: essential [workers, labor, businesses] (people, often underpaid, who are actually treated as expendable because they are required to work and thus risk infection from coronavirus)
 2021: unalive (used as a substitute for “suicide” or “kill” to avoid social media filters)
 2022: special military operation (Russian designation for invasion of Ukraine)

Most likely to succeed
 2008: shovel-ready (description of infrastructure projects that can be started quickly, when funds become available)
 2009: twenty-ten (pronunciation of the year 2010, as opposed to saying "two thousand ten" or "two thousand and ten")
 2010: trend (verb for exhibiting a burst of online buzz)
 2011: cloud (online space for the large-scale processing and storage of data)
 2012: marriage equality (legal recognition of same-sex marriage)
 2013: binge-watch (to consume vast quantities of a single show or series of visual entertainment in one sitting)
 2014: salty: exceptionally bitter, angry, or upset.
 2015: ghost: (verb) abruptly end a relationship by cutting off communication, especially online.
 2018: single-use (made to be used only once and destroyed)
 2019: ok boomer (retort to someone older expressing out-of-touch or condescending views)
 2020: antiracism (the practice of actively working to prevent or combat racism)
 2021: antiwork (position supporting the refusal to work, pushing back against labor exploitation)
 2022: quiet quitting (doing no more than the minimum required for a job)

Least likely to succeed
 2008: PUMA (an acronym for "Party Unity My Ass" and later, "People United Means Action" as used by Democrats who were disaffected after Hillary Clinton failed to secure a sufficient number of delegates)
 2009: Naughties, Aughties, Oughties, etc. (alternative names for the decade 2000–2009)
 2010: culturomics (research project from Google analyzing the history of language and culture)
 2011: brony (an adult male fan of the "My Little Pony" cartoon franchise)
 2012: phablet (mid-sized electronic device, between a smartphone and a tablet)
 2013: Thanksgivukkah (confluence of Thanksgiving and the first day of Hanukkah that will not be repeated for another 70,000 years)
 2014: platisher: online media publisher that also serves as a platform for creating content.
 2015: sitbit: device that rewards sedentary lifestyle (play on Fitbit fitness tracker).

Special categories
 Election-Related Word (2008): maverick (a person who is beholden to no one, widely used by the Republican presidential and vice-presidential candidates John McCain and Sarah Palin)
 Fan Words (2010): gleek (a fan of the TV show Glee)
 Occupy Words (2011): the 99%, 99 percenters (those held to be at a financial or political disadvantage to the top moneymakers, the one-percenters)
 Election Words (2012): binders (full of women) (a term used by Mitt Romney in the second presidential debate to describe the resumes of female job candidates that he consulted as governor of Massachusetts)
 Most Productive (2013): -shaming: (from slut-shaming) type of public humiliation (fat-shaming, pet-shaming).
 Most Notable Hashtag (2014): #blacklivesmatter: protest over Black people killed at the hands of police (esp. Michael Brown in Ferguson, Mo., Eric Garner in Staten Island).

References

American Dialect Society
American Dialect Society's Words of the Year